Centriscus scutatus is a slender fish that reaches a length of . It is found at depth between 2 and 333 m (typically 2–15 m) in the Indian and Pacific oceans, from the Red Sea and Persian Gulf up to Japan, New Caledonia and Australia. This coastal species inhabit mud or silty sand next to sea grasses or corals. It swims almost vertically, sometimes in large groups, with head pointed downwards, and feeds on small crustaceans.

References

External links
 

Centriscidae
Taxa named by Carl Linnaeus
Fish described in 1758